Wuqi can refer to:

 Wuqi County, a county in Yan'an, Shaanxi, China
 Wuqi District, an urban township in Taichung County, Taiwan
 Wuqi Subdistrict, a township-level division of Xinhua District, Shijiazhuang, Hebei, China